Tootsies and Tamales is a 1919 American silent two-reel comedy film featuring Oliver Hardy.

Cast
 Jimmy Aubrey - The Rummy Romeo
 Oliver Hardy - The Murderous Mexican (as Babe Hardy)
 Maude Emory - Señorita
 Bud Ross
 Richard Smith

See also
 List of American films of 1919
 Oliver Hardy filmography

External links

1919 films
American silent short films
American black-and-white films
1919 comedy films
Films directed by Noel M. Smith
Vitagraph Studios short films
1919 short films
Silent American comedy films
American comedy short films
1910s American films